Dubai Pearl was a 73-storey, tall residential skyscraper project situated along Al Sufouh Road in Dubai, United Arab Emirates. The project was first announced in 2002. Construction was on hold from 2006 to 2022, with the site eventually demolished. The building would have consisted of four mixed-use towers connected together at the base and by a sky bridge at the top.  The structural design was carried out by the Dubai-based engineering firm e-Construct, and the project would have cost $4 billion (Dh14.6 billion). Had it been completed, Dubai Pearl would have accommodated 9,000 residents and its commercial sector would have employed 12,000 people.

Investment issues 
The Omnix Group, the company responsible for the initial proposal for the building in 2002, struggled to act on its plans. The project was taken over by the Abu Dhabi Al-Fahim Group in 2007, but progress stalled on the project. In 2014, Hong Kong-based Chow Tai Fook Endowment Industry Investment Development (CTFE) reportedly bought a $1.9bn share of the project, promising to restart the project later that year, though that never happened.

Demolition and redevelopment 
In July 2016, some witnesses reported on Twitter, showing images of the construction cranes on the project site being removed, and the complex remains abandoned. By October 2022, the entirety of the site was demolished, as it was choosen for the new Moon Dubai project.

See also
 List of tallest buildings in Dubai

References

External links
Dubai Pearl official website
Dubai Pearl in trouble

Buildings and structures in Dubai Media City
Unbuilt buildings and structures in Dubai
Postmodern architecture in Dubai
Residential skyscrapers in Dubai